The 2006 Virginia Cavaliers football team represented the University of Virginia in the 2006 NCAA Division I FBS football season. The team's head coach was Al Groh. They played their home games at Scott Stadium in Charlottesville, Virginia.

Preseason
Coming off an up and down season, the 2006 Virginia Cavaliers looked to continue their success while initiating a new starting quarterback.

Schedule

Personnel

Coaching staff

References

Virginia
Virginia Cavaliers football seasons
Virginia Cavaliers football